The following lists events that happened during 1810 in Chile.

Incumbents
Royal Governor of Chile: Francisco Antonio García Carrasco(-July 16), Mateo de Toro Zambrano (July 16-September 18)

Events

July
16 July - Governor Francisco Antonio García Carrasco is forced to resign.

September
18 September - The Government Junta of Chile (1810) is established.

Births
1810 - Matías Cousiño (d. 1863)
1810 - Candelaria Pérez (d. 1870)

Deaths
18 December - Nicolasa Valdés (b. 1733)

References 

 
Chile